Leopold Just (February 26, 1903 – February 25, 1999) was a Latvian-born engineer who came to New York City in 1921, and eventually became a partner in the Ammann & Whitney firm of consulting engineers. He was involved in the  design of many major New York City bridges, including  parts of the George Washington Bridge and the Lincoln Tunnel,  the Throgs Neck Bridge linking the Bronx and Queens and, most notably, the Verrazano-Narrows Bridge linking Staten Island with Brooklyn.   His work outside of New York City included the Washington Metro, Ohio Turnpike and Connecticut Turnpike. He earned a degree in civil engineering from the Polytechnic Institute of Brooklyn in 1929, and died at age 95.

References

Polytechnic Institute of New York University alumni
1999 deaths
American civil engineers
1903 births
Latvian emigrants to the United States